Ralph Taylor (March 29, 1773 – February 9, 1847) was a merchant and political figure in Lower Canada. He represented Missisquoi in the Legislative Assembly from 1829 to 1834.

He was born in Philipsburg, Lower Canada, the son of Alexander Taylor, a United Empire Loyalist from New York, and Jane Brisbane. He served as a commissioner for the trial of minor causes and as a school inspector for Missisquoi and Shefford counties. Taylor married Maria Lester in 1816. Up until 1832, he supported the Parti patriote, but he voted against the Ninety-Two Resolutions. In March 1833, he was put in prison for 24 hours for publishing a letter in the Quebec Mercury critical of the speaker of the assembly. He died in Philipsburg at the age of 53.

References 

1773 births
1847 deaths
Members of the Legislative Assembly of Lower Canada